is a former professional Japanese baseball player.

External links

1973 births
Living people
Baseball people from Fukuoka Prefecture
Japanese baseball players
Nippon Professional Baseball infielders
Yokohama Taiyō Whales players
Yokohama BayStars players
Yomiuri Giants players
Osaka Kintetsu Buffaloes players
Tohoku Rakuten Golden Eagles players
Japanese baseball coaches
Nippon Professional Baseball coaches